Ramiro Ortiz (11 March 1903 – March 1982) was a Puerto Rican sports shooter. He competed in the 50 m pistol event at the 1952 Summer Olympics.

References

1903 births
1982 deaths
People from Yabucoa, Puerto Rico
Puerto Rican male sport shooters
Olympic shooters of Puerto Rico
Shooters at the 1952 Summer Olympics